A referendum on the creation of a Sidama Region was held on regionalisation in the Sidama Zone of Ethiopia on 20 November 2019. The creation of such a region is a long-standing claim of the Sidama people.

The management of the referendum and its likely centrifugal consequences on Ethiopia's system of ethnic federalism was seen as a crucial test for Prime Minister Abiy Ahmed's policy of democratic openness ahead of the 2020 general election.

Results

The choices on the ballot paper were for the Sidama people to be organized within their own regional state, which was represented by the election symbol of “Shafeta” (traditional Sidama food vessel) and for Sidama to stay in the Southern Nations, Nationalities, and Peoples' Region (SNNPR), represented by the “Gojo” (traditional Sidama hut) symbol. The latter choice got a very small percentage of votes, an expected result given the popularity of the decades-long statehood quest among the Sidama and the lackluster campaigning by the SNNPR.

Aftermath

The result meant Sidama would become Ethiopia's 10th regional state, with its own regional constitution and regional council, enjoying a degree of sovereignty enshrined in Ethiopia's multinational constitution.

The Sidama regional state, the 10th regional state which in Ethiopia would border Guji Zone and West Arsi Zone of the Oromia Region as well as Wolayita Zone and Gedeo Zone of the SNNPR.

The question of what to do about the city of Awasa in Sidama Zone, which is also the capital city of the SNNPR but would be outside of the region when the Sidama state was officially declared, was a sticking point for some time, but was addressed when the regional council decided that the SNNPR government would stay in Awasa for two consecutive election terms during which it would facilitate its own future capital city.

The Sidama Region officially came into being on 18 June 2020, seven months after the referendum was held.

The successful referendum also resulted in giving hope to other ethnicities belonging to the SNNPR who wanted their own regional state as the Sidama region had done, and led to the 2021 South West Region referendum.

References

External links
National Election Board of Ethiopia Referendums page

Sidama Region
Sidama Region 
Autonomy referendums
November 2019 events in Africa
Referendums in Ethiopia 
Sidama Region
Administrative division referendums